Raymond Brown (February 23, 1908 – February 8, 1965) was an American right-handed pitcher in Negro league baseball, almost exclusively for the Homestead Grays.

During his career, he was widely considered the best pitcher in the Negro leagues at the time, and led the Grays to eight pennants in one nine-year span. He was also considered a very good pinch hitter and a solid bat. In February 2006, he was elected to the Baseball Hall of Fame.

Biography
Born in Alger, Ohio, he had a large variety of pitches in his arsenal, including a sinker, a slider, and even a knuckleball, but his best pitch was his curveball. Brown would fire the curveball at a batter no matter what the count was, having supreme confidence in that pitch. Brown played for Cum Posey's Homestead Grays from 1932 to 1945. Brown married Posey's daughter, Ethel. In 1944, he went 9–3 for the champion Grays, and threw a one-hit shutout in the Negro World Series to put them on top of the African-American baseball world. In 1945, he threw a seven-inning perfect game.

After his long stint with the Grays, he opted to play in Mexico and in the Canadian Provincial League in his final years. In those years, he continued to dominate most batters, leading Sherbrooke to a title in the Provincial League. He also pitched a no-hitter for Santa Clara of the Cuban Winter League, a baseball sanctuary, at that time, for many black players during the winter season. Brown also helped them to the Cuban title that year (1936).

In the Negro league version of the All-Star Game, the East-West All-Star Game, Brown got the start in 1935.

Brown led the league in wins eight times (1931, 1935, 1937–38, 1940–42, 1944). He also led the league in ERA twice (1938, 1940) along with three times in strikeouts (1931, 1937–38) among statistics that ranged from games played to innings. He was the second player in Negro league history to win the pitching Triple Crown, doing so in 1938 with fourteen wins, seventy strikeouts, and an 1.88 ERA.

Like most great Negro leaguers, Brown managed as well later on in his career. He was one of five black players mentioned as being of major league caliber in a 1938 wire sent to the Pittsburgh Pirates by the Pittsburgh Courier. The other four were Josh Gibson, Buck Leonard, Cool Papa Bell and Satchel Paige.

Brown died at age 56 in Dayton, Ohio.

He was named to the Washington Nationals Ring of Honor for his "significant contribution to the game of baseball in Washington, D.C" as part of the Homestead Grays on August 10, 2010.

References

External links
 and Baseball-Reference Black Baseball stats and Seamheads

1908 births
1965 deaths
Baseball players from Dayton, Ohio
Dayton Marcos players
Homestead Grays players
Indianapolis ABCs (1931–1933) players
Leopardos de Santa Clara players
National Baseball Hall of Fame inductees
People from Hardin County, Ohio
American expatriate baseball players in Cuba
20th-century African-American sportspeople
Thetford Mines Miners players